Saint Lucia competed at the 2019 Pan American Games in Lima, Peru from July 26 to August 11, 2019.

David Christopher of Saint Lucia's boxing federation's president served as the chef de mission.

On July 18, 2019, the Saint Lucia Olympic Committee named a team of seven athletes (three men and four women) competing in three sports.

During the opening ceremony of the games, sailor Luc Chevrier carried the flag of the country as part of the parade of nations.

Competitors
The following is the list of number of competitors (per gender) participating at the games per sport/discipline.

Medalists
The following competitors from Saint Lucia won medals at the games. In the by discipline sections below, medalists' names are bolded.

|  style="text-align:left; vertical-align:top;"|

Athletics (track and field)

Saint Lucia qualified four track and field athletes (one man and three women). Both of Saint Lucia's medals were won in the sport. Levern Spencer defended her title from four years prior in Toronto. While Albert Reynolds won bronze in the javelin throw on the penultimate day of competition. Both athletes were awarded with cash prizes for their performances after the games.

Key
Note–Ranks given for track events are for the entire round
NR = National record

Field events

Sailing

Saint Lucia qualified two sailors (one male and one female).

Swimming

Saint Lucia received one universality spot in swimming to enter one man.

Men

See also
Saint Lucia at the 2020 Summer Olympics

References

Nations at the 2019 Pan American Games
2019
Pan